The Princeton Tigers represented Princeton University in ECAC women's ice hockey during the 2016–17 NCAA Division I women's ice hockey season.

Offseason

August 14: Kelsey Koelzer was named to the Team USA U22 roster, while Stephanie Sucharda and Steph Neatby were named to Team Canada U22.

Recruiting

2016–17 Tigers

Schedule

|-
!colspan=12 style="  style="background:black;color:#F77F00;"| Regular Season

|-
!colspan=12 style="  style="background:black;color:#F77F00;"| ECAC Tournament

Awards and honors
Carly Bullock, ECAC Rookie of the Year

Steph Neatby, ECAC Goaltender of the Year

Steph Neatby, Goaltender, All-ECAC First Team

Kelsey Koelzer, Defense, All-ECAC Second Team<

Karlie Lund, Forward, All-ECAC Lund Team

Carly Bullock, Forward, All-ECAC Rookie Team

Steph Neatby, Goaltender, All-ECAC Rookie Team

References

Princeton
Princeton Tigers women's ice hockey seasons
Princeton Tigers
Princeton Tigers